Chris Reinhold (born 20 December 1997), formerly known as Chris Robinson, is an American professional pool player from Ventura, California. He competed on Team USA in the 2020 Mosconi Cup and the 2021 Mosconi Cup.

On Father's Day in 2021, he announced that he was adopting the last name of the stepfather who raised him, Jarod Reinhold.

Titles
 2021 Sidepocket Open 9-Ball Championship
 2018 Annual Cole Dickson 9-Ball
 2017 ACUI Collegiate National Championship

References

External links 

American pool players
Sportspeople from California
1997 births
9-Ball players
People from Ventura, California
Living people